Acantharctia nivea is a species of moth of the family Erebidae. It was described by Per Olof Christopher Aurivillius in 1900. It is found in Angola, Cameroon, the Democratic Republic of the Congo, Nigeria and Senegal.

References

Moths described in 1900
Spilosomina
Insects of Cameroon
Insects of Angola
Lepidoptera of West Africa
Moths of Africa